Sarah Storck is a Swedish former professional footballer who played as a forward in the Swedish league Damallsvenskan. Her first professional club was Bälinge IF, for which she played 17 times in the Damallsvenskan in 2008. In 2009 she moved to LdB FC Malmö. The next year she went on loan to Vittsjö GIK. She later played for IK Sirius FK. Her last club was AIK Fotboll. She retired from professional football after the 2018 season. At the international level, she represented Sweden in the Under-17, Under-19 and Under-23 teams.

Storck was instrumental in Malmö winning the Supercup in 2011, a match held just prior to the start of the 2011 Damallsvenskan season between league champions Malmö and cup winners Örebro. She scored the first goal for Malmö and, in the final minutes of extra time, hit the cross-bar, with the oncoming Manon Melis scoring from the rebound. She played two matches in the 2011–12 UEFA Women's Champions League for Malmö.

References 

1990 births
Living people
Swedish women's footballers
Damallsvenskan players
FC Rosengård players
Footballers from Uppsala
Women's association footballers not categorized by position
AIK Fotboll (women) players
Elitettan players
IK Sirius Fotboll players
Bälinge IF players